Alphanodavirus is a genus of non-enveloped positive-strand RNA viruses in the family Nodaviridae. Insects, mammals, and  fishes serve as natural hosts. Diseases associated with this genus include: Nodamura virus paralysis in infected wax moth larvae. Member viruses can also provoke paralysis and death to suckling mice and suckling hamsters. There are five species in this genus.

Structure

Viruses in the genus Alphanodavirus are non-enveloped, with icosahedral geometries, and T=3 symmetry. The diameter is around 30 nm. Genomes are linear and segmented, bipartite, around 21.4kb in length.

Life cycle
Viral replication is cytoplasmic. Entry into the host cell is achieved by penetration into the host cell. Replication follows the positive-strand RNA virus replication model. Positive-strand RNA virus transcription, using the internal initiation model of subgenomic RNA transcription is the method of transcription. Member viruses are released by lysis of the infected host cell. Insects, mammals, and  fishes serve as the natural host.

Taxonomy 
The genus has five species:
 Black beetle virus
 Boolarra virus
 Flock House virus
 Nodamura virus
 Pariacoto virus

References

External links
 ICTV Report: Nodaviridae
 Viralzone: Alphanodavirus

Nodaviridae
Virus genera